The 1997 Cork Senior Football Championship was the 109th staging of the Cork Senior Football Championship since its establishment by the Cork County Board in 1887. The draw for the opening fixtures took place on 8 December 1996. The championship began on 10 May 1997 and ended on 9 November 1997.

Clonakilty entered the championship as the defending champions, however, they were defeated by Muskerry in the second round.

On 9 November 1997, Beara won the championship following a 1-10 to 1-07 defeat of Castlehaven in a replay of the final. This was their 6th championship title overall and their first title since 1967.

Beara's Ciarán O'Sullivan was the championship's top scorer with 1-24.

Team changes

To Championship

Promoted from the Cork Intermediate Football Championship
 Clyda Rovers

Results

First round

Second round

Quarter-finals

Semi-finals

Finals

Championship statistics

Top scorers

Overall

In a single game

References

Cork Senior Football Championship
Cork Senior Football Championship